Buena Vista is an unincorporated community in Posey Township, Franklin County, Indiana.

History
Buena Vista was laid out in 1848 by William Pruet, a landowner. Its name commemorates the Battle of Buena Vista.

Geography

References

Unincorporated communities in Franklin County, Indiana
Unincorporated communities in Indiana